Letterio Piccolo Cucinotta (March 27, 1902, Pace del Mela, Messina, Sicily - October 9, 1987, Messina, Sicily, Italy) was an Italian racecar driver who participated in the 1930 Indianapolis 500.

According to Indianapolis Motor Speedway historian Donald Davidson, very little is known about Cucinotta, who was from Messina, Italy, and drove with his own Maserati (sent at his own expense from Italy), but not for the team. He made only one appearance at Indianapolis, and is not known to have participated in any other American major automobile races. He was given the nickname "Piccolo Pete" by the crowd.

He participated in many Italian races like Targa Florio, Tripoli Grand Prix and Coppa Acerbo. He was born in 1902 and died in 1987. His best overall score was a second place at the 1928 Coppa Messina, held on a 52-km road circuit in Sicily, and a class win at the 1926 Coppa Vinci driving an 1100 cc S.A.M. voiturette, also held at Messina. After the war, Cucinotta continued racing until 1964.

Indy 500 results

References

Italian racing drivers
Indianapolis 500 drivers
1902 births
1987 deaths